The Magnesium Transporter 1 (MagT1) Family (TC# 1.A.76) is a group of magnesium transporters that are part of the TOG superfamily. Goytain and Quamme identified a Mg2+-related transporter whose expression or function was affected by an implantation-associated protein precursor. They designated this protein, MagT1. MagT1 is expressed as a 335 amino acid polypeptide which includes five transmembrane helices. The nascent polypeptide possesses a cleavage site after the N-terminal signal sequence helix, rendering a mature MagT1 protein with four transmembrane helices. MagT1 additionally contains a number of phosphorylation sites.

Recent evidence demonstrates that the primary function of MagT1 is protein glycosylation, mediated by MagT1's function as a component of the oligosaccharyltransferase (OST).

Function 
When expressed in Xenopus laevis oocytes, MagT1 mediates saturable Mg2+ uptake with a Km of 0.23 mM. Transport of Mg2+ by MagT1 is rheogenic, voltage-dependent, and does not display time-dependent inactivation. Transport is specific to Mg2+, as other divalent cations do not evoke currents. Large external concentrations of some cations inhibited Mg2+ transport (Ni2+, Zn2+, Mn2+) in MagT1-expressing oocytes although Ca2+and Fe2+ were without effect.  MagT1 has an N-terminal thioredoxin domain of unknown function.

Zhou and Clapham identified two mammalian genes, MagT1 and TUSC3, catalyzing Mg2+ influx. MagT1 is universally expressed in all human tissues, and its expression level is upregulated in low extracellular Mg2+. Knockdown of either MagT1 or TUSC3 protein lowered the total and free intracellular Mg2+concentrations in mammalian cell lines. Morpholino knockdown of MagT1 and TUSC3 protein expression in zebrafish embryos resulted in early developmental arrest; excess Mg2+ or supplementation with mammalian mRNAs rescued these effects. Thus, MagT1 and TUSC3 are vertebrate plasma membrane Mg2+ transport system.

Transport reaction 
The reaction catalyzed by MagT1, or a potential downstream glycosylation target (e.g. a Mg2+ transporter), is:
 Mg2+ (out) → Mg2+ (in)

Role in magnesium deficiency 
The identification of genetic changes and their functional consequences in patients with immunodeficiency resulting from loss of MAGT1 revealed that magnesium and MagT1 are key molecular players for T cell-mediated immune responses. This led to the description of XMEN (X-linked immunodeficiency with magnesium defect, Epstein-Barr Virus infection, and neoplasia) syndrome, for which Mg2+ supplementation has been shown to be beneficial. Similarly, the identification of copy-number variation leading to dysfunctional MAGT1 in a family with atypical ATR-X syndrome and skin abnormalities, suggested that the MAGT1 defect is responsible for the cutaneous problems.

Role in protein glycosylation 
MagT1 and its homologue TUSC3 are both bona fide components of the oligosaccharyltransferase (OST).

References 

Protein families
Membrane proteins
Transmembrane proteins
Transmembrane transporters
Transport proteins
Integral membrane proteins